The Dental Technologists Association (DTA) is the professional body representing dental technicians in the United Kingdom.

History 
The association began life as the Dental Technicians Education and Training Advisory Board (DTETAB) and was established by the General Dental Council (GDC). The remit of DTETAB was to review and make recommendations about the education and training of dental technicians, the suitability of that training and how it would fit with the demands of providing dental services. The other main role for DTETAB was maintaining a Voluntary Register of Dental Technicians, which served as the precursor to the GDC statutory register. The inaugural meeting of the Board took place in January 1986 and was chaired by Margaret Seward (later Dame Margaret Seward). The GDC was only actively involved for the first three years and DTETAB became an independent professional body in 1989 with Colin Lee, a dental technician and laboratory owner from north west England, as chairman. Ray Cox served as registrar from 1989 - 1992 and was succeeded by Sue Adams who was in post from 1992 - 2019. Appointed in January 2019, Rebecca Kinahan now manages the Associations' Office.

Anticipating a slightly different role post statutory registration, DTETAB became the Dental Technicians Association in 2002. The final name change came in 2012 when the association became the Dental Technologists Association.

Offices 
The headquarters of the DTA is based at PO Box 1318, Cheltenham GL50 9EA. The Operations Co-ordinator of the association is Rebecca Kinahan, who is responsible for managing the Association's office, providing the first point of contact for members.

Council 
The DTA council is the governing body of the association. Delroy Reeves is president, Dominika Krowiarz is deputy president and Tony Griffin is treasurer. Other council members include Robert Leggett, Joanne Stevenson, Irina Greidane, Patricia MacRory, Barry Tivey, David Etchells and David Caufield.

Chairs of the Dental Technicians Education and Training Advisory Board

Presidents of the Dental Technologists Association

Vision and Key Objectives

Vision
To advance standards within dental technology for the benefit of the oral healthcare of the United Kingdom by:
Providing advice guidance and support to members.
Raising awareness and promoting an exchange of views on key issues affecting the dental profession.

Key Objectives
Develop and support members, and the dental technology profession.
Encourage and promote education, including CPD.
Forge links with other organisations.
Promote views to relevant external organisations.
Adopt and share best practice.
Provide benefits and employment opportunities.
Develop and maintain roles and responsibilities.

DTA Fellowships

Fellowship of the DTA is awarded for outstanding contribution to dental technology. Recipients should have maintained the dignity of the dental technology profession over a period of time, striven to enhance the recognition, evidence and education of dental technology and have the majority support of the DTA Council. Fellows are entitled to the postnominal FDTA.

Recipients

Publications

The Technologist

The Technologist is the official DTA journal. Published quarterly, The Technologist aims to raise awareness, educate, engage and showcase information, products and services relevant to members. The Technologist editorial team consists of editor Derek Pearson, editorial assistant Keith Winwood and editorial panel: Tony Griffin, Joanne Stevenson and Barry Tivey.

Articulate 
Articulate is a quarterly e-newsletter and is also edited by Derek Pearson.

External links
 Official website

1989 establishments in the United Kingdom
Allied health professions-related professional associations
Dental organisations based in the United Kingdom
Dental organizations
Medical associations based in the United Kingdom
Organisations based in Gloucestershire
Organizations established in 1989